August Rytkönen (24 December 1886, Iisalmen maalaiskunta – 18 December 1960) was a Finnish construction worker and politician. He served as a Member of the Parliament of Finland from 1922 to 1923, representing the Socialist Workers' Party of Finland (SSTP). He was imprisoned on sedition charges in 1923.

References

1886 births
1960 deaths
People from Iisalmi
People from Kuopio Province (Grand Duchy of Finland)
Socialist Workers Party of Finland politicians
Members of the Parliament of Finland (1922–24)
Prisoners and detainees of Finland